The Family Herald: A Domestic Magazine of Useful Information & Amusement (1843–1940) was a weekly story paper launched by George Biggs in 1842, and re-established in May 1843 with James Elishama Smith and mechanised printing. By 1855 it had a circulation of 300,000.

Initially a penny weekly, the Family Herald later sold at 2d. Contributors included James George Stuart Burges Bohn, Charlotte Mary Brame (1836–84), Bertha Henry Buxton, William Carpenter, James Hain Friswell, Fanny Aikin Kortright (1821–1900), Watts Phillips (1825–74), Frederick William Robinson (1830–1901), Nina Moore Jamieson (1885-1932), Henrietta Stannard (1856–1911), Annie Tinsley (1808–85) and Mary Cecil Hay.

It is mentioned in the Sherlock Holmes story ‘ ‘The Problem of Thor Bridge’ ‘.

References

External links
Victorian Periodicals

1842 establishments in the United Kingdom
1940 disestablishments in the United Kingdom
Weekly magazines published in the United Kingdom
Defunct literary magazines published in the United Kingdom
Magazines established in 1843
Magazines disestablished in 1940